Serge Losique (born in 1931 in Yugoslavia) is the founder & president of the Montreal World Film Festival since its opening. He is the father of television host Anne-Marie Losique.

External links
Montreal World Film Festival

People from Montreal
Living people
Film festival founders
Canadian people of Yugoslav descent
1931 births
Date of birth missing (living people)